is a special ward in Tokyo, Japan. The ward refers to itself as Suginami City in English.

As of June 1, 2022, Suginami has an estimated population of 588,354 and a population density of 17,274 persons per km2. The total area is 34.06 km2.

Geography
Suginami occupies the western part of the ward area of Tokyo. Its neighbors include these special wards: to the east, Shibuya and Nakano; to the north, Nerima; and to the south, Setagaya. Its western neighbors are the cities of Mitaka and Musashino.

The Kanda River passes through Suginami. The Zenpukuji river originates from Zenpukuji Park in western Suginami, and the Myōshōji River originates in Myōshōji Park, to the north of Ogikubo station.

History
The name Suginami dates back to the early Edo period and is a shortened version of Suginamiki ("avenue of cedars"). This name came about when an early land baron, Lord Tadayoshi Okabe, planted a row of cedar trees to mark the bounds of his property.

The ward was founded on March 15, 1947.

In 1970, 40 high school students in the area were exposed to photochemical smog and required hospitalization. The incident attracted national attention and increased awareness of the dangers of pollution.

Districts and neighborhoods

The following neighborhoods make up Suginami-ku.

Iogi Area
Igusa
Imagawa
Kamiigusa
Kamiogi
Minamiogikubo
Momoi
Nishiogikita
Nishiogiminami
Ogikubo
Shimizu
Shimoigusa
Zenpukuji
Suginami Area
Amanuma
Asagayakita
Asagayaminami
Hon'amanuma
Kōenjikita
Kōenjiminami
Naritahigashi
Naritanishi
Umezato

Takaido Area
Hamadayama
Kamitakaido
Kugayama
Miyamae
Shimotakaido
Shōan
Takaido
Takaidohigashi
Takaidonishi
Wadabori Area
Eifuku
Hōnan
Horinouchi
Izumi
Matsunoki
Ōmiya
Wada

Politics
Historically, Suginami has leaned toward liberal activism. In 1954, local housewives launched the "Suginami Appeal" against nuclear weapons, a petition that spread nationwide and ultimately collected 20 million signatures. More recently in 2005, Suginami became part of Japan's fight against nationalist textbook revisionism when residents petitioned Tokyo's courts to prevent the adoption of a controversial textbook published by Fusosha Publishing which claimed to justify Japanese actions during World War II. The ward has also passed an ordinance placing limits on the installation of security cameras.

To combat burglaries, which reached a record number of 1,710 in 2002, the ward created an unconventional anti-crime program called Operation Flower. The ward urged residents to plant flowers facing the street, with the long-term goal of increasing neighborhood watchfulness (necessitated by watering and otherwise attending to the plants). In addition, 9,600 volunteers were recruited for neighborhood safety patrols, 200 security cameras were placed at crime-vulnerable areas, and a daily email update was created for residents. Subsequent to the start of the program, burglaries were down 80% to 390 in 2008.

Suginami refused to connect to Japan's Residents Basic Registry Network. As of 2005, it is implementing a measure to make registry optional.

On June 19, 2022, Satoko Kishimoto was elected mayor despite being a long-time resident of Belgium and not having any connections to the ward. She narrowly defeated 3-term incumbent Ryō Tanaka by less than 200 votes. Kishimoto had come to prominence through online political debates during the COVID-19 pandemic. Kishimoto has opposed building new road extensions through Kōenji district and the privatization of public facilities. Kishimoto is the district's first-ever female leader and plans on creating more opportunities for women in Japanese politics. Japan currently has only 2 female politicians in the current national cabinet and only 3 female mayors out of Tokyo's 23 main districts.

Transportation

Rail
JR East
Chūō Main Line (Chūō-Sobu Line): Koenji, Asagaya, Ogikubo, Nishi-Ogikubo Stations
Keio Corporation
Keio Line: Hachiman-yama Station, Roka-kōen Station
Keio Inokashira Line: Eifuku-cho, Nishi Eifuku, Hamada-yama, Takaido, Fujimi-ga-oka, Kuga-yama Stations
Seibu Railway
 Seibu Shinjuku Line: Shimo-Igusa, Iogi, Kami-Igusa Stations
Tokyo Metro
 Tokyo Metro Marunouchi Line: Honancho (branch line); Higashi Koenji, Shin-Koenji, Minami Asagaya, Ogikubo Stations

Road
 National highways: Route 20, the Kōshū Kaidō
 Kan-nana Dori (Number 7 Ring Road)
 Kan-pachi Dori (Number 8 Ring Road)
 Itsukaichi Kaidō (Suginami Akiruno Line, Tokyo Metropolitan Road Route 7)
 Ōme Kaidō

Education

Public high schools are operated by the Tokyo Metropolitan Government Board of Education.

 Nishi High School
 
 
 
 
 
 

Suginami City operates public elementary and junior high schools.

Municipal combined elementary and junior high schools:
 Koenji Gakuen (高円寺学園)
 Suginami Izumi Gakuen (杉並和泉学園)

Municipal junior high schools:

 Amanuma Junior High School (天沼中学校)
 Asagaya Junior High School (阿佐ヶ谷中学校)
 Fujimigaoka Junior High School (富士見丘中学校)
 Higashida Junior High School (東田中学校)
 Higashihara Junior High School (東原中学校)
 Igusa Junior High School (井草中学校)
 Iogi Junior High School (井荻中学校)
 Konan Junior High School (高南中学校)
 Koyo Junior High School (向陽中学校)
 Matsunoki Junior High School (松ノ木中学校)
 Miyamae Junior High School (宮前中学校)
 Nakase Junior High School (中瀬中学校)
 Nishimiya Junior High School (西宮中学校)
 Ogikubo Junior High School (荻窪中学校)
 Omiya Junior High School (大宮中学校)
 Sen-nan Junior High School (泉南中学校)
 Shinmei Junior High School (神明中学校)
 Shokei Junior High School (松溪中学校)
 Sugimori Junior High School (杉森中学校)
 Takaido Junior High School (高井戸中学校)
 Wada Junior High School (和田中学校)

Municipal elementary schools:

 Amanuma (天沼小学校)
 Eifuku (永福小学校)
 Fujimigaoka (富士見丘小学校)
 Hachinari (八成小学校)
 Hamadayama (浜田山小学校)
 Higashita (東田小学校)
 Honan (方南小学校)
 Horinouchi (堀之内小学校)
 Iogi (井荻小学校)
 Kugayama (久我山小学校)
 Kutsukake (沓掛小学校)
 Mabashi (馬橋小学校)
 Matsunoki (松ノ木小学校)
 Momoi No. 1 (桃井第一小学校)
 Momoi No. 2 (桃井第二小学校)
 Momoi No. 3 (桃井第三小学校)
 Momoi No. 4 (桃井第四小学校)
 Momoi No. 5 (桃井第五小学校)
 Nishita (西田小学校)
 Ogikubo (荻窪小学校)
 Omiya (大宮小学校)
 Sanya (三谷小学校)
 Seibi (済美小学校)
 Shinomiya (四宮小学校)
 Shoan (松庵小学校)
 Suginami No. 1 (杉並第一小学校)
 Suginami No. 2 (杉並第ニ小学校)
 Suginami No. 3 (杉並第三小学校)
 Suginami No. 6 (杉並第六小学校)
 Suginami No. 7 (杉並第七小学校)
 Suginami No. 9 (杉並第九小学校)
 Suginami No. 10 (杉並第十小学校)
 Takaido (高井戸小学校)
 Takaido No. 2 (高井戸第二小学校)
 Takaido No. 3 (高井戸第三小学校)
 Takaido No. 4 (高井戸第四小学校)
 Takaido Higashi (高井戸東小学校)
 Wada (和田小学校)

International schools:
 Bunka Suginami Canadian International School
  - North Korean school

Higher Education:
 Meiji University, Izumi Campus

Economy

Animation
Several animation studios are located in Suginami. Bones is headquartered in Igusa, while Sunrise has its headquarters near the Kami-Igusa Station on the Seibu Shinjuku Line. Bones was founded by former members of Sunrise, and staff at each company often help each other on projects. The Satelight studio, founded in Sapporo, relocated to the Asagaya neighborhood in 2006 (an earlier Tokyo office, at a different location in Suginami, had been in existence since 2003). In addition, many smaller studios are based here; as of 2006, over 70 studios (of 400 throughout Japan) were located in Suginami.

Japanese operations
The communications and electronics giant Iwatsu Electric is headquartered in Kugayama.

Foreign operations
American Express used to have its headquarters located in a building south of Ogikubo station but it moved to a location in central Tokyo in 2020.

Microsoft has a branch office in the Daitabashi Asahi Seimei Building in Izumi.

Former economic operations
Prior to its disestablishment, Data East had its headquarters in Suginami.

Culture

 Ōmiya Hachiman Shrine
 Suginami Kokaido: a concert hall and the home of the Japan Philharmonic Orchestra. It is also the same place where , the pre-premiere special of Ultraman was held which recorded on July 9, 1966 and later aired on Tokyo Broadcasting System (the Ultra Series' original network before TV Tokyo) the next day in 7:00 pm. In fact, as a tribute to the 50th anniversary of the Ultra Series,  was held in Suginami Kokaido on July 10, 2016.
 Suginami Animation Museum: a small museum which includes a screening theater, library, and historical overview of Japanese animation, with English language explanations

References

External links

Suginami City Official Website 

 
Wards of Tokyo